General elections were held in the Netherlands on 15 June 1897. The Liberal Union remained the largest party, winning 48 of the 100 seats in the House of Representatives.

Results

References

General elections in the Netherlands
Netherlands
1897 in the Netherlands
Election and referendum articles with incomplete results
June 1897 events